Bucculatrix lassella is a moth of the family Bucculatricidae. It is found in Australia. It was first described in 1880 by Edward Meyrick.

External links
Australian Faunal Directory

Moths of Australia
Bucculatricidae
Moths described in 1880